Saint Nicholas Church of New Julfa, (Armenian: ,), is an Armenian Apostolic church in New Julfa, Iran. It is located in Gharagel neighbourhood of New Julfa.

History 

Saint Nicholas Church was built in 1630 and like St. John and St. Minas churches of New Julfa, was called St. Mary. It was renamed to St. Nicholas Church in 1779 when the right hand relic of St. Nicholas was brought here. In the courtyard, there is a chapel named after St. Stephen, built in 1774. There several tombstones in the courtyard, one of them belonging to Khoja Minas who was burnt alive by Nader Shah. The church has been renovated in 1916 and 1955.

See also
Iranian Armenians
List of Armenian churches in Iran

References 

 Architecture in Iran
Churches in Isfahan
Armenian Apostolic churches in Iran
Oriental Orthodox congregations established in the 17th century
Tourist attractions in Isfahan